Clifeteana Rena McKiver Miller (born October 5, 1980) is a former professional basketball player in the WNBA.

East Carolina and Tulane statistics
Source

References

External links
STING: Season In Review: Teana Miller
Teana Miller Basketball-Reference.com

1980 births
Living people
American expatriate basketball people in France
American women's basketball players
Basketball players from North Carolina
Charlotte Sting players
East Carolina Pirates women's basketball players
Phoenix Mercury players
Sportspeople from Wilmington, North Carolina
Tulane Green Wave women's basketball players
Undrafted Women's National Basketball Association players
Centers (basketball)